The Football League 2009–10 (called Coca-Cola Football League for sponsorship reasons), was the seventeenth season under its current league division format. It began in August 2009 and ended on 8 May 2010.

The Football League is contested through three divisions. The second division of these is League One. Norwich City and Leeds United were automatically promoted to the Football League Championship as winners and runners-up respectively, and they were joined by the winner of the League One play-offs Millwall. The bottom four teams in the league were relegated to the third division, League Two.

Changes from last season

From League One
Promoted to Championship
 Leicester City
 Peterborough United
 Scunthorpe United

Relegated to League Two
 Northampton Town
 Crewe Alexandra
 Cheltenham Town
 Hereford United

To League One
Relegated from Championship
 Norwich City
 Southampton
 Charlton Athletic

Promoted from League Two
 Brentford
 Exeter City
 Wycombe Wanderers
 Gillingham

League table

Play-offs

First Leg

Second Leg

Charlton Athletic 3–3 Swindon Town on aggregate. Swindon Town win 5–4 on penalties.

Millwall win 2–0 on aggregate.

Final

Millwall are promoted to the Football League Championship

Results

Top scorers

Stadia

Managerial changes

Kits

References 

 
EFL League One seasons
2009–10 Football League
3
Eng